Chaenactis xantiana, the Mojave pincushion or Xantus pincushion, is a flowering plant in the family Asteraceae, native to the western United States, from southeastern Oregon, Nevada, southern and eastern California and northwestern Arizona. It is very common in the Antelope Valley in the Mojave Desert, and grows in sandy soils.

Description
Chaenactis xantiana is an annual plant growing to 50 cm tall. The leaves are somewhat succulent, 3–7 cm long and 3–4 mm broad, in a basal rosette on the young plants which wither away during flowering, and spirally arranged leaves on the flowering stem; they are green, finely flecked with white scales giving an overall grayish color to the plant.

The Mojave pincushion flowers are produced in a capitulum 3–6 cm diameter, and are white.

It is similar to Chaenactis stevioides (Esteve pincushion).

The species is named for Hungarian-American ichthyologist John Xantus (1825-1894).

References

External links
 Calflora Database: Chaenactis xantiana (Fleshcolor pincushion,  Xantus pincushion, Xantus' chaenactis)
Jepson Manual eFlora (TJM2) treatment of Chaenactis xantiana
USDA Plants Profile for Chaenactis xantiana (fleshcolor pincushion)
Wildflowers of the Santa Monica Mountains— photo of Chaenactis xantiana
U.C. Photos gallery of Chaenactis xantiana

xantiana
Flora of California
Flora of Arizona
Flora of Nevada
Flora of Oregon
Flora of the Sierra Nevada (United States)
North American desert flora
Flora of the California desert regions
Flora of the Great Basin
Natural history of the California chaparral and woodlands
Natural history of the Mojave Desert
Natural history of the Transverse Ranges
Plants described in 1865
Taxa named by Asa Gray
Flora without expected TNC conservation status